Trillium hibbersonii is a species of flowering plant in the bunchflower family Melanthiaceae. The specific epithet hibbersonii honors the English Canadian surveyor John Arthur Hibberson (1881–1955) who first collected this plant in 1938 on Vancouver Island in British Columbia. Hibberson and his son propagated the trilliums, selling them to buyers in England and other European countries. In 1968, Leonard Wiley coined the Latin name Trillium hibbersonii, a name that has since been used by horticulturists without reservation.

When botanists finally became aware of Hibberson's trillium in 1974, it was circumscribed as a dwarf form of Trillium ovatum that occurs occasionally throughout the range of the species (which spans some nine states and provinces in western North America). Apart from Vancouver Island, no such trillium has ever been found. In 1995, Darlene O'Neill showed conclusively that Trillium "hibbersonii" is endemic to Vancouver Island, and moreover, it is distinct from Trillium ovatum. Her results languished for 25 years before it was finally concluded that not only is Trillium hibbersonii a distinct species, but it is more closely related to Trillium erectum of eastern North America than it is to Trillium ovatum.

Description
Like all trilliums, it has a whorl of three bracts (leaves) and a single trimerous flower with 3 sepals, 3 petals, two whorls of 3 stamens each, and 3 carpels (fused into a single ovary with 3 stigmas). The flower, which has a short stalk (called a pedicel), opens pink and becomes dark pink with age.

The ratio of bract length to width is 2.3 on average, a value that remains constant throughout the season. The bract halves are often held at an angle to the longitudinal axis. The pedicel, which averages  in length, is streaked with red and bent in such a way that the flower faces outward about 45 degrees. Like the bracts, the green sepals are reddish along the edges. The petals are ovate to elliptic, averaging  in length. The stamens are about half the length of the petals but do not extend beyond the stigmas. The creamy-white filaments are shorter than the anthers, with the anther connective tissue being purple on its outward-facing side. The ovary is yellow-green to red-brown in color and ridged but not prominently winged in shape. The fruit is a berry-like capsule with irregular dehiscence.

Taxonomy
Leonard Wiley invalidly described Trillium hibbersonii in 1968. A few years later, in 1974, Taylor and Szczawinski described a dwarf form of Trillium ovatum that grows on the sea cliffs of Vancouver Island in British Columbia. Known as Trillium ovatum f. hibbersonii , the "dwarf trillium" became a variety in 2001, and was finally elevated to species rank in 2020. Surprisingly, phylogenetic analysis has shown that Trillium hibbersonii is more closely related to T. erectum than to T. ovatum, making it the only member of the Erectum group in western North America.

Distribution
Trillium hibbersonii is found on the west coast of Vancouver Island in British Columbia. As originally described, it was thought to occur occasionally throughout the range of the species, but that is no longer believed to be true. There are just four known populations of T. hibbersonii, all on Vancouver Island, which makes the species a source of conservation concern.

Ecology
In general, Trillium species are myrmecochorous, that is, ants facilitate seed dispersal. Trillium seeds have a white fleshy appendage called an elaiosome, which attracts ants. Since each seed of Trillium hibbersonii has an attached elaiosome, presumably its seeds are dispersed by ants as well.

Once dispersed, Trillium seeds exhibit a type of dormancy called morphophysiological dormancy, sometimes called "double dormancy", which requires two full winters to completely break dormancy. Apparently Trillium hibbersonii does not have this requirement. In one experiment, 90% of plants broke dormancy after a single cold period.

Bibliography

References

External links
 
 
 

hibbersonii
Flora of the Western United States
Plants described in 2020